Cape Sainte Marie, formerly known as Cape Romain and Cape St. Mary, is the southernmost point of Madagascar.  It is situated in the Androy region  from Tsiombe.  It is the location of the Cap Sainte-Marie Special Reserve, a nature reserve which occupies most of the cape and was created in 1962.

References

Landforms of Madagascar
Androy
Populated places in Androy
Special reserves of Madagascar
Headlands of Africa
Madagascar spiny thickets